Iris Takes the Fallen Hero to Olympus (German: Iris trägt den gefallenen Helden zum Olymp empor), or sometimes Nike Takes the Fallen Hero to Olympus (German: Nike trägt den gefallenen Helden zum Olymp empor) is an 1857 sculpture by August Wredow, installed on Schlossbrücke in Berlin, Germany.

See also

 1857 in art

References

External links
 

1857 establishments in Germany
1857 sculptures
Nude sculptures in Germany
Outdoor sculptures in Berlin
Sculptures of men in Germany
Sculptures of Greek goddesses
Statues in Germany